Wayaobu Subdistrict, is a subdistrict in the county-level city of Zichang, Yan'an, Shaanxi, China. As of 2010, Wayaobu had a population of 113,698.

History 
On December 17, 1935, Wayaobu held the Wayaobu Conference, where the Central Committee of the Chinese Communist Party met to discuss Chinese class relations, as well as the idea of a united front against Japan. The conference resulted in the Wayaobu Manifesto, which emphasized the urgency of mobilizing to defend against Japan, and called on forming a united front, albeit one without the Nationalist government.

In 2015, Wayaobu was changed from a town to a subdistrict.

Administrative divisions 
The subdistrict is divided into seven residential communities and 36 administrative villages.

References 

Yan'an
Subdistricts of the People's Republic of China
Township-level divisions of Shaanxi